South Hamilton Community School District is a rural public school district headquartered in Jewell, Iowa. It includes an elementary school and a middle/high school.

The district is mostly in Hamilton County with a section in Boone County. It serves Jewell Junction, Ellsworth, Randall, and Stanhope.

History
Circa 1998, there was a bond that would allow the district to change the grade configuration; at the time it had grades 5–12 in the secondary school building, originally intended only as a senior high school, while it hoped to have only grades 7–12 there, with students until grade 5 in the elementary school.

In 2006, there were parents in the Hubbard–Radcliffe Community School District who preferred to send their children to South Hamilton schools instead of the Eldora–New Providence district, which Hubbard–Radcliffe had a grade-sharing agreement with. Parents in the western portion of Hubbard–Radcliffe preferred the idea of that district grade-sharing with South Hamilton instead of Eldora–New Providence. Some parents preferring the South Hamilton district purchased a bus to transport their children there. Tom Barton of the WCF Courier wrote that "many" Hubbard–Radcliffe parents chose South Hamilton schools.

Schools
The district operates two schools on a single campus in Jewell.
South Hamilton Elementary School
South Hamilton High School

South Hamilton High School

Athletics
The Hawks compete in the Heart of Iowa Conference in the following sports:

Cross country 
Volleyball
Football
Basketball 
 Girls' 1965 state champions 
Wrestling
Track and field 
Golf
Baseball 
 1962 state champions 
Softball
 3-time state champions (1964, 1965, 1974)

See also
List of school districts in Iowa
List of high schools in Iowa

References

External links
 South Hamilton Community School District
 

School districts in Iowa
Education in Boone County, Iowa
Education in Hamilton County, Iowa
School districts established in 1962
1962 establishments in Iowa